Marinobacter segnicrescens is a Gram-negative, non-spore-forming, ellipsoid-shaped, moderately halophilic and motile bacterium from the genus of Marinobacter which has been isolated from sediments from the South China Sea.

References

External links
Type strain of Marinobacter segnicrescens at BacDive -  the Bacterial Diversity Metadatabase

Further reading 
 
 

Alteromonadales
Bacteria described in 2007
Halophiles